Argodrepana marilo is a moth in the family Drepanidae. It was described by Wilkinson in 1970. It is found in New Guinea.

The wingspan is 16.8-18.5 mm. The forewing costa is dark buff and there are grey subbasal antemedial, postmedial and double subterminal fasciae, as well as a faint ring in the cell between the antemedial and postmedial fasciae. The hindwings are as the forewings, but lack the subbasal fascia.

References

Moths described in 1970
Drepaninae
Moths of New Guinea